The Jackson Expedition, also known as the siege of Jackson, occurred in the aftermath of the surrender of Vicksburg, Mississippi, in July 1863.  Union Maj. Gen. William Tecumseh Sherman led the expedition to clear General Joseph E. Johnston's relief effort from the Vicksburg area. The mission was successful and helped ensure that the Mississippi River remained in Union possession for the remainder of the war.

Background
In the Vicksburg Campaign, one of the intermediate battles was the battle of Jackson on May 14, 1863, in which Maj. Gen. Ulysses S. Grant's Army of the Tennessee captured the capital city of Jackson, Mississippi, but then evacuated it to move west toward Vicksburg. During the siege of Vicksburg, Johnston had been gathering troops at Jackson, intending to relieve pressure on Lt. Gen. John C. Pemberton's beleaguered garrison. Johnston cautiously advanced his 30,000 soldiers toward the rear of Grant's army surrounding Vicksburg. In response, Grant ordered Sherman to deal with Johnston's threat.

Expedition
By July 1, 1863, Johnston's force was in position along the Big Black River. Sherman used the newly arrived IX Corps to counter this threat. On July 5, the day after the surrender of Vicksburg was made official, Sherman was free to move against Johnston. Johnston hastily withdrew his force across the Big Black River and Champion's Hill battlefields with Sherman in pursuit. Sherman had with him the IX Corps, XV Corps, XIII Corps, and a detachment of the XVI Corps.

Siege of Jackson

On July 10, the Union Army had taken up position around Jackson. The heaviest fighting came on July 12, during an unsuccessful Union attack. Brig. Gen. Jacob Gartner Lauman advanced a brigade under Col. Isaac C. Pugh too close to the Confederate works manned by Brig. Gen. Daniel Weisiger Adams's brigade, which resulted in heavy casualties. As a result, Lauman was relieved of command for failing to properly carry out the orders of his superior, Maj. Gen. Edward Ord. Instead of risking entrapment, Johnston chose to evacuate the state capital and withdrew on July 16. Sherman's forces occupied the city on the following day.

The re-capture of the city effectively ended the last threat to Vicksburg.

Notes

References
 Ballard, Michael B. The Civil War in Mississippi: Major Campaigns and Battles. Jackson, MS: University of Mississippi Press, 2011. .
 Dyer, Frederick H.  A Compendium of the War of the Rebellion Des Moines, IA: The Dyer Publishing Company, 1908.
 Gue, Benjamin F.  History of Iowa from the Earliest Times to the Beginning of the Twentieth Century. Volume 4. New York, Century History Co, 1903.  1903. p. 164. Biographical sketch of Jacob G. Lauman.
 Korn, Jerry, and the Editors of Time-Life Books. War on the Mississippi: Grant's Vicksburg Campaign. Alexandria, VA: Time-Life Books, 1985. .
 Thompson, Seymour D.  Recollections with the Third Iowa. Cincinnati: Published for the author, 1864. Online version .
 Woodrick, Jim. The Civil War Siege of Jackson, Mississippi. Charleston, SC: The History Press, 2016. .

External links
 Map of Union and Confederate works around Jackson, Plate 37
 Map of Lauman's attack

Vicksburg campaign
Battles of the Western Theater of the American Civil War
Union victories of the American Civil War
Hinds County, Mississippi
Joseph E. Johnston
William Tecumseh Sherman
Conflicts in 1863
1863 in Mississippi
Battles of the American Civil War in Mississippi
July 1863 events